Lanvallay is a commune in the Côtes-d'Armor department of Brittany in northwestern France.

Population
Inhabitants of Lanvallay are called côtissois in French.

Twinning
There is a twinning arrangement with Walkern, Hertfordshire.
This was initiated around the time of the 800th anniversary of the Magna Carta.

See also
Communes of the Côtes-d'Armor department

References

External links

Official website 

Communes of Côtes-d'Armor